Adrian Wichser (born March 18, 1980) is a retired Swiss ice hockey winger, who played for different clubs in the Swiss National League A (NLA), including EHC Kloten, HC Lugano, ZSC Lions and Rapperswil-Jona Lakers. He won the Swiss national championship in 2003 and 2008 as well as the Champions Hockey League in 2009. Wichser was the leading scorer of the NLA in the 2002-03 campaign.

Internationally, he won 99 caps for the Swiss men's national team, participating in the 2006 Winter Olympics and five World Championships.

He announced his retirement in April 2018 and became a skill coach.

Career statistics

Regular season and playoffs

International

References

External links

1980 births
Living people
Florida Panthers draft picks
GCK Lions players
HC Lugano players
HC Thurgau players
Ice hockey players at the 2006 Winter Olympics
EHC Kloten players
Olympic ice hockey players of Switzerland
People from Winterthur
Swiss ice hockey centres
SC Rapperswil-Jona Lakers players
ZSC Lions players
Sportspeople from the canton of Zürich